Molly R. Morris is an American behavioral ecologist who has worked with treefrogs and swordtail fishes in the areas of alternative reproductive tactics and sexual selection.

Morris received a Bachelor of Arts from Earlham College and a PhD from Indiana University. As a National Science Foundation postdoctoral fellow at the University of Texas at Austin, her work with Mike Ryan demonstrated equal fitnesses between alternative reproductive tactics in a species of swordtail fish. She joined the faculty at Ohio University in 1997, where she is now a professor in the Department of Biological Sciences. She is also the Associate Editor for the journal Behavior. Her publication credits include multiple papers on Animal behavior and Ecology. Her current research relates to diabetes, as well as behavioral ecology, using the swordtail fish Xiphophorus as a model organism.

Personal life
Morris is married to Kevin de Queiroz, an evolutionary biologist at the Smithsonian Institution's National Museum of Natural History.

Selected works

References

External links 
 

American ecologists
Women ecologists
Earlham College alumni
Indiana University alumni
Living people
Ohio University faculty
1956 births
Place of birth missing (living people)